Jeremy Crutchley is a British-born South African actor and singer. He played roles in the television series Salem, Black Sails, Leonardo, Constantine and Hannibal and several theatre and cinema works in a career spanning for more than four decades.

Personal life
In 1978, he graduated with a B.A.(Hons) degree in drama, from the University of Natal, RSA.

Career
Crutchley's career began in the action comedy film Crazy Safari . Then in 1989, he played the role of "Billy Foul" in the film The Journey to the Center of the Earth. In the 1990s, he acted in Africa-based films such as A Good Man in Africa, Pride of Africa and two episodes of the television series Rhodes. In 1978, he wrote and played the music and lyrics for plays Bloodbreath Anaesthetic, and Sloper. In 1984, he composed music for the play Brothers of The Head produced by Brian Aldiss. In 1992, he played the role as "Dr Frank’n’Furter" in the film The Rocky Horror Show. In 2010, he wrote and recorded his first studio album, Release. He owned a band called "The Standing Wave".

In 1989, he played the role of "Charlotte Von Mahlsdorf" in the stage play I am My Own Wife and then in the "Broadway Hit" produced by Doug Wright, where he later won 2 Fleur du Cap Theatre Awards for Best Actor and Best Solo Performance for this performance. Apart from that, he performed for The Royal Shakespeare Company at Stratford-Upon-Avon in the plays: The Merchant of Venice, for which he won the Fleur Du Cap Best Actor Award. Then with Orange Tree Theatre, he played 8 roles in 11 productions such as The Dice House. In the 1980s, he performed as "Slim" in play Cowboy Mouth produced by Sam Shepard, at the Market Theatre, as "Alan Strang" in Equus produced by Peter Shaffer.

After the millennium, he acted in the films Red Water, The Poseidon Attack, Supernova - When the sun explodes, A love in Saigon, The last days of Krakatau and Lost City Raiders. In 2008, he acted in the film Lord of War and Doomsday: day of vengeance. In 2012, Crutchley played the role of "Psychoin" in the home movie Death Race: Inferno directed by Roel Reiné. In 2011, he acted in the film Retribution, where he was nominated for the SAFTA Golden Horn for Best Actor: Feature Film at the South African Film and Television Awards.

In the television, he appeared as "Dr Stan Ginsburg" in Falling Water, "Doorhaus" in Blindspot, "Senator Buchanan" in Taken, "Puritan Magistrate Hathorne" in Salem and the "pirate Morley" in Black Sails. He also appeared in theatre works, where he performed as 'The Other’ in Sacred Elephant performed at the La MaMa Theatre.

In 2015 he acted in the film Flytrap In 2016, he was nominated for the Festival Award for Best Actor in Leading Role at the International Filmmaker Festival of World Cinema. In 2017 at the Idyllwild International Festival of Cinema, he was nominated for the IIFC Award for Best Actor for the same role. In 2020, he co-wrote and produced the short film Demus, which is currently under post-productions. In the film, he also composed and performed the original soundtrack music.

Apart from acting, he is also a voice-over artist that rendered his voice for film, commercials and animation such as Infinity Train on Cartoon Network.

Filmography

References

External links
 

1961 births
South African male film actors
Living people
British male film actors
University of Natal alumni